Eduardo Navarro (born 1979 in Buenos Aires) is a contemporary Argentinian artist. He lives and works in Buenos Aires, Argentina. Since 2002, he has worked in a variety of mediums, including sculpture, collage, performance and installation.

Work

Navarro's projects are wide in range. At the launch of a five-month pedagogical program in concert with the 9th Bienal do Mercosul, Eduardo Navarro sent a telepathic message from his home in Buenos Aires to those willing to receive it whom had attended a lecture on curiosity at the Bienal.

Education
Navarro studied from 2003–2005 with artist Guillermo Kuitca in the Program for the Visual Arts C.C.R.R. in Argentina, where he lives and works. In 2006, he studied at the Skowhegan School of Painting and Sculpture and received a UBS Art Scholarship/Individual grant Program for emerging artists.

Exhibitions (selection)

(breathspace), Gasworks, London, UK (2020) 
In Collaboration with the Sun, Museum of Contemporary Art Mac Niteroi, Rio, Brazil (2019) 
Instant Weather Prediction, PIVO, Sao Paulo, Brazil (2019) 
Galactic Playground, Casa tomada Site Santa Fe´s Biennial Exhibition (2018) 
Polenphonia, Rayuela-Art Basel Cities, Buenos Aires, Argentina (2018)
Into Ourselves, Drawing Center The Lab, New York, USA (2018) 
Metabolic Drawings, FUTURO. ARCO, Madrid, Spain (2018)
Celestial Numbers, Metamorphoses. Let Everything Happen to You, Catello de Rivoli, Torino, Italy (2018) 
Letters to Earth, KölnSkulptur 9 La Fin de Babylone. Mich wundert, dass ich so fröhlich bin!, Skulpturen Park Koln, Germany (2017) 
OCTOPIA, Museo Rufino Tamayo, DF, Mexico (2016) 
Sound Mirror, Incerteza viva. 32 Sao Paulo Biennial, Brazil (2016)
We Who Spin Around, High Line Art, New York, USA (2016)
Timeless Alex, New Museum Triennial, New York, USA (2015) 
XYZ, 12 Sharjah Biennial, UAE (2015)
Ir para Volver, 12th Cuenca Biennial, Ecuador (2014) 
Weather Permitting, 9th Mercosur Biennial, Brazil (2013) 
Horses Don't Lie, 9th Mercosur Biennial, Brazil (2013) 
Aquella mañana…, Parque de la Memoria, Buenos Aires Argentina (2013) 
Estudio Jurídico Mercosur III (Mercosur Law Studio III). AES+F and Eduardo Navarro, Faena Arts Center (2013) 
Órbita, Ensayo de Situación, Soy un Pedazo de Atmósfera, Di Tella University, Buenos Aires, Argentina (2013)
There is always a cup of sea to sail in, 29th São Paulo Biennial, Brazil (2010) 
Screaming and Hearing, 7th Mercosur Biennial, Brazil (2009) 
OPEN e v + a 2009, Reading the City, EVA Ireland Biennial, Limerick City, Ireland (2009) 
Do Not Feed, Frederieke Taylor Gallery, New York, USA (2008) 
The Great Transformation, Kunst und Takitsche Magie, Frankfurter Kunstverein, Germany (2008) 
Fabricantes Unidos (Manufactured States), Daniel Abate Gallery, Buenos Aires (2008) 
From Confrontation to Intimacy, Americas Society, USA (2007) 
The Pod Show, Blanton Museum-Art Palace Austin, Texas, USA (2006)
Civilización y Barbarie, MAC, Santiago de Chile, Chile (2005)

References

External links
 Artist website.
 "Do Note Feed." Joanne Bernstein Exhibition Text. 2009. 
¨OCTOPIA¨, publication by Museo Rufino Tamayo, with texts by Chus Martinez and Sarah Demeuse, and an interview by Manuela Moscoso and Daniela Perez (2016)
"Eduardo Navarro." Art Pension Trust. Biographical Entry

Argentine artists
1979 births
Living people